The following list includes notable people who were born or have lived in Galesburg, Illinois. For a similar list organized alphabetically by last name, see the category page People from Galesburg, Illinois.

Educators, scientists, writers, and journalists 

 Barry Bearak, Pulitzer Prize-winning journalist (lived in Galesburg while attending Knox College)
 Edward Beecher, theologian and abolitionist; brother of Harriet Beecher Stowe; first president of Illinois College
 Jonathan Blanchard, abolitionist, social reformer, and educator; President of Knox and founder of Wheaton College
 Ira Clifton Copley, publisher and statesman, founder of Copley Press
 John Huston Finley, former editor of the New York Times, professor at Princeton University, president of Knox and City College of New York
 George Helgesen Fitch, author, humorist, journalist
 George Washington Gale, founder of Knox
 Anna Groff Bryant, vocal teacher at Lombard College
 Robert Hellenga, novelist and George A. Lawrence Distinguished Service Professor of English at Knox
 George William Hunter, biologist and author of Civic Biology, textbook at heart of famed Scopes Monkey Trial (former professor at Knox)
 Alexander Kuo, author, poet, essayist 
 Francis T. McAndrew, evolutionary psychologist and essayist; Cornelia H. Dudley Professor of Psychology at Knox
 Emily Arnold McCully, children's book author, winner of 1993 Caldecott Medal
 Carl Sandburg, writer and editor; winner of three Pulitzer Prizes, two for poetry and one for biography of Abraham Lincoln; born in Galesburg
 Ellen Browning Scripps, journalist and philanthropist, founder of Scripps Institution of Oceanography
 Robert Seibert, Robert W. Murphy Professor Emeritus of Political Science at Knox and coauthor of Politics and Change in the Middle East
 Chad Simpson, short and flash fiction author
 Marilyn Salzman Webb, activist, author, and journalist
 Mary Allen West, journalist, editor, educator, superintendent of schools, and temperance worker
 Douglas L. Wilson, author, co-director of Lincoln Studies Center; George A. Lawrence Distinguished Service Professor Emeritus of English at Knox 
 Richard L. Wilson, newspaperman, recipient of 1954 Pulitzer Prize for National Reporting; born in Galesburg in 1905
 Quincy Wright, political scientist
 Sewall Wright, evolutionary biologist, a founder of modern population genetics
 Theodore Paul Wright, aeronautical engineer; served as acting president of Cornell University

Business innovators and inventors 

 Earnest Elmo Calkins, advertising executive, founder of first modern advertising agency
 George Washington Gale Ferris Jr., inventor of the Ferris wheel
 Whitcomb L. Judson, inventor of the zipper
 Charles Rudolph Walgreen, founder of Walgreens

People in the arts 

 Frank Shaver Allen, architect of Streator and Joliet, later of California, born in Galesburg in 1860
 Karen Bjornson (born 1952), model; born in Galesburg
 Amy Carlson, Television actress best known for her roles in Blue Bloods, Third Watch, and Another World. Lived in Galesburg when she attended Knox College.
 Vir Das, comedian and Bollywood actor (lived in Galesburg while attending Knox College)
Mae Shumway Enderly (born 1871), harpist, entertainer born in Galesburg
 Hugh Gillin, actor
 Michael Greer, actor, comedian, and cabaret performer
 Otto Harbach, lyricist and librettist; known for "Smoke Gets in Your Eyes", "Indian Love Call" and "Cuddle up a Little Closer, Lovey Mine" (lived in Galesburg while attending Knox College)
 Dorsha Hayes, actress
 Kayleigh McKee, voice actress
 Mark Nicolson, opera singer
 Tim Piper, visual designer; born in Galesburg
 Stephen Prina, contemporary artist
 George Reeves, actor, played Superman in popular 1950s television show
 Dorothea Tanning, painter, printmaker, sculptor and writer
 Rudy Vaughn, singer-songwriter
 Chris Verene, artist
 Allan Arthur Willman, classical pianist and composer
 Matthew Wilson, jazz drummer, composer and band leader, born in Galesburg in 1964

Military leaders 

 Joseph A. Ahearn, U.S. Air Force general
 Mary Ann Bickerdyke, also known as "Mother Bickerdyke"; Civil War nurse for Union Army
 Gustavus Cheyney Doane, US Army officer and explorer
 David P. Fridovich, retired lieutenant general and Green Beret in U.S. Army, deputy commander of U.S. military's United States Special Operations Command (lived in Galesburg while attending Knox College)
 Hobart R. Gay, U.S. Army general, served under General George S. Patton

Politics, government, and law 

 William Adcock, Illinois state representative and farmer, lived in Galesburg
 Edgar Bancroft, lawyer and diplomat; served as United States Ambassador to Japan
 John Rusling Block, Cabinet member in Ronald Reagan administration; born in Galesburg
Susan E. Cannon Allen, African-American suffragist
 George Radcliffe Colton, US Army colonel; Governor of Puerto Rico (1909–1913)
 Edwin H. Conger, U.S. congressman, diplomat, and lawyer
 Omer N. Custer, Illinois State Treasurer and newspaper editor; lived in Galesburg
 Phil Hare, U.S. congressman representing Illinois's 17th district
 Don Harmon, Illinois State Senator (Lived in Galesburg while attending Knox College)
 Carl Hawkinson, Illinois politician; born in Galesburg
 Russell Jump, Mayor of Wichita, Kansas; born in Galesburg
 Richard R. Larson, Illinois state legislator, educator, and businessman; born in Galesburg
 Charles B. Lawrence, Chief Justice of Illinois Supreme Court; lived in Galesburg
 Leo F. O'Brien. Illinois state representative and lawyer; born in Galesburg
 John Podesta, chairman of Hillary Clinton presidential campaign, 2016, Chief of staff to President Bill Clinton, and Counselor to President Barack Obama; lived in Galesburg while attending Knox
 Ronald Reagan, 40th president of the United States; lived in Galesburg in his youth
 Don Samuelson, 25th Governor of Idaho
 George L. Shoup, first Governor of Idaho; moved to Galesburg at age 16
 Wallace Thompson, Illinois State Senator; born in Galesburg
 Richard H. Whiting, U.S. Representative 1875-77; lived in Galesburg

Sports figures 

 Barry Cheesman, former PGA Tour Golfer, born and raised in Galesburg
 Mike Davison, pitcher for San Francisco Giants; born in Galesburg
 Bill Essick, former professional baseball pitcher
 A. J. Fike, driver with NASCAR
 Aaron Fike, driver with NASCAR
 Jimmie Foxx, Major League Baseball Hall of Famer; lived in retirement in Galesburg during the 1960s 
 Todd Hamilton, golfer with PGA Tour, 2004 British Open champion; born in Galesburg
 Willie Heston, college football halfback and coach; state judge in Michigan; born in Galesburg
 Irma Hopper, Olympic fencer; born in Galesburg
 Elbert Kimbrough, safety with NFL's Los Angeles Rams, San Francisco 49ers, and New Orleans Saints; born in Galesburg
 Todd Monken, offensive coordinator and Quarterbacks coach for the University of Georgia. Former offeinsoive coordinator of the NFL's Cleveland Browns and Tampa Bay Buccaneers and former head coach at the University of Southern Mississippi. (lived in Galesburg while attending Knox College)
 Jason Shay, head basketball coach for East Tennessee State
 Jim Sundberg, catcher with  Milwaukee Brewers, Kansas City Royals, Chicago Cubs, and Texas Rangers; born in Galesburg
 Art Twineham, catcher for St. Louis Browns; born in Galesburg
 Pete Weber, sports broadcaster, voice of NHL's Nashville Predators; born in Galesburg

References

Galesburg
Galesburg